Summer of My Amazing Luck is the first novel by the Canadian author Miriam Toews published in 1996 by Turnstone Press.

It is a humourous novel about "welfare mothers" in a Winnipeg housing complex, who take a summer trip to Colorado.
 The novel was shortlisted for the Stephen Leacock Memorial Medal for Humour, and the McNally Robinson Book of the Year Award. The story was loosely-based on Toews's own experiences as a young mother.

After the success of A Complicated Kindness, Summer of My Amazing Luck and Toews's second novel A Boy of Good Breeding were re-released by Toews's current publisher Penguin Random House in 2006.

References

1996 Canadian novels
Novels set in Manitoba